The Pacific Music Festival (パシフィック・ミュージック・フェスティバル) is an international classical music festival held annually in Sapporo, Japan. It was founded in 1990 by Leonard Bernstein, along with the London Symphony Orchestra, with the original plan of holding the festival in Beijing. The original artistic directors were Leonard Bernstein and Michael Tilson Thomas.

History

2018 / 29th 
7 Jul (Sat) - 1 August (Wed) for 26 days

2017 / 28th 
8 July - 1 August

Artists

Conductors

Artistic Directors

 Leonard Bernstein (1990) 
 Michael Tilson Thomas (1990-2000)
 Christoph Eschenbach (1991, 93-98)
 Charles Dutoit (2000–02)
 Fabio Luisi (2010–12)
 Valery Gergiev (2015-2019)

Principal Conductors 

 Bernard Haitink (2003)
 Valery Gergiev (2004, 06)
 Nello Santi (2005)
 Riccardo Muti (2007)
 Fabio Luisi (2008)
 Jun Märkl (2013, 15, 17)
 John Axelrod (2016, 18)
 Lahav Shani (2022)

Guest Conductors 

 Edo de Waart (2003)
 Fabio Luisi (2004)
 Jun Märkl (2005, 08)
 Yakov Kreizberg (2006)
 Philippe Jordan (2007)
 Andrey Boreyko (2007)
 Tadaaki Otaka (2008)
 Xian Zhang (2009)
 Krzysztof Urbański (2011)
 Eivind Gullberg Jensen (2012)
 Alexander Vedernikov (2013)
 Andris Poga (2015)
 Edwin Outwater (2018)

Faculty

Orchestra (2019 season)

Violin 

 Rainer Küchl / former concertmaster of the Wiener Phiharmoniker
 Daniel Froschauer / Wiener Philharmoniker
 David Chan / Metropolitan Opera Orchestra
 Stephen Rose / Cleveland Orchestra

Viola 

 Heinrich Koll / former principal of the Wiener Philharmoniker
 Daniel Foster / National Symphony Orchestra

Cello 

 Stefan Gartmayer / Wiener Philharmoniker
 Rafael Figueroa / Metropolitan Opera Orchestra

Double Bass 

 Michael Bladerer / Wiener Philharmoniker
 Alexander Hanna / Chicago Symphony Orchestra

Flute 

 Andreas Blau / former principal of the Berliner Philharmoniker
 Stefán Ragnar Höskuldsson / Chicago Symphony Orchestra

Oboe 

 Andreas Wittmann / Berliner Philharmoniker
 Eugene Izotov / San Francisco Symphony

Clarinet 

 Alexander Bader / Berliner Philharmoniker
 Stephen Williamson / Chicago Symphony Orchestra

Bassoon 

 Stefan Schweigert / Berliner Philharmoniker
 Daniel Matsukawa / Philadelphia Orchestra

Horn 

 Sarah Willis / Berliner Philharmoniker
 William Caballero / Pittsburgh Symphony Orchestra

Trumpet 

 Tamás Velenczei / Berliner Philharmoniker
 Mark J. Inouye / San Francisco Symphony

Trombone 

 Jesper Busk Sørensen / Berliner Philharmoniker
 Denson Paul Pollard / Metropolitan Opera Orchestra

Percussion 

 Cynthia Yeh / Chicago Symphony Orchestra

Timpani 

 David Herbert / Chicago Symphony Orchestra

Harp 

 Ladislav Papp / Wiener Staatsoper
 Mariko Anraku / Metropolitan Opera Orchestra

Vocal Academy (2019 season)

 Gabriella Tucci

Conducting Academy 

 Leonard Bernstein (1990)
 Fabio Luisi (2010–12)
 Andris Poga (2015)
 John Axelrod (2016)
 Jun Märkl (2017)

References

External links
PMF Official Website

Music festivals established in 1990
Classical music festivals in Japan
Sapporo
Music festivals in Japan
Leonard Bernstein